Aleksandr Nikolayevich Gorbachyov (born 22 November 1970) is a Russian professional football coach and a former player. He is the manager of Torpedo Vladimir.

Club career
He made his professional debut in the Soviet Second League in 1989 for FC Signal Izobilny. He played four games in the UEFA Intertoto Cup 1998 for FC Baltika Kaliningrad.

Coaching career
On 15 January 2021, he was banned from any football activity for a year after fielding 3 players who tested positive for COVID-19 in a league game and submitting fake negative test results to the league.

References

1970 births
Living people
People from Izobilnensky District
Sportspeople from Stavropol Krai
Soviet footballers
Russian footballers
Russian Premier League players
FC KAMAZ Naberezhnye Chelny players
FC Dynamo Stavropol players
FC Baltika Kaliningrad players
FC Fakel Voronezh players
FC Elista players
FC Yenisey Krasnoyarsk players
FC SKA Rostov-on-Don players
Russian football managers
Russian expatriate football managers
Expatriate football managers in Latvia
FC Baltika Kaliningrad managers
FC SKA-Khabarovsk managers
Association football defenders